Bayanaul is a settlement in Pavlodar Region, Kazakhstan. It is the capital of Bayanaul District and the administrative center of the Bayanaul rural district (KATO code - 553630100). Population:

Geography 
Bayanaul lies in the Kazakh Uplands, just below the slopes of Bayanaul Range, near lake Sabyndykol. The Bayanaul National Park, a  protected area, is located in the district, within the perimeter of the mountain range.

References

External links
Bayanaul - Tourism (in Russian)

Populated places in Pavlodar Region